Ulrich "Uli" Hoeneß (born 5 January 1952) is the former president of German football club Bayern Munich and a former footballer for West Germany who played as a forward for club and country. Hoeneß represented Germany at one World Cup and two European Championships, winning one tournament in each competition.

During his playing career he was mainly associated with Bayern Munich, with whom he won three league championship titles and three European Cup titles. He later served as the club's general manager. In 2014 he pleaded guilty to tax evasion, ultimately serving 18 months in prison for the offence.

Early life and education

Hoeneß was born in Ulm, Württemberg-Baden. He attended the Hans-Multscher-Grundschule before changing to the Schubarth-Gymnasium, both located in Ulm.

Club career
In 1970, he played as left-sided forward with amateurs TSG Ulm 1846 and was recruited by Udo Lattek, then manager of Bundesliga club FC Bayern Munich. Hoeneß immediately made an impact, scoring six times in 31 matches as the Bavarians finished in second position, behind Borussia Mönchengladbach, and adding the domestic cup.

During his eight-and-a-half-year stint with Bayern, Hoeneß enjoyed great success, winning a total of eight major titles, including three league titles and as many European Cups. In the 1973–74 edition of the latter competition, the final replay against Atlético Madrid, he produced one of his most outstanding performances, scoring two goals in the 4–0 victory. However, in the final of the following year's European Cup against Leeds United, he was brutally fouled by Frank Gray and suffered an injury on his right knee from which he never fully recovered.

In late 1978, Hoeneß was loaned to Bayern neighbours 1. FC Nürnberg, where it was hoped he could get more match practice. His recovery failed, however, and he was forced to hang up his boots at a mere 27. He had appeared in 250 matches in Germany's top division, netting 86 times.

International career

Hoeneß played 35 times for West Germany. His debut came on 29 March 1972, he scored the final goal in a 2–0 friendly win in Hungary.

As one of six Bayern players in the German squad, Hoeneß won both UEFA Euro 1972 and the 1974 FIFA World Cup. In the final of the latter, against Holland, he committed a foul on Johan Cruyff in the opening minute that led to a goal from the subsequent penalty, but West Germany came from behind to win 2–1. He also played with the national side in Euro 1976 in Yugoslavia, where he missed the decisive West German shot in the penalty shootout loss against Czechoslovakia, skying it over the crossbar.

Hoeneß had retained his amateur status until 1972, allowing him to take part in that year's Summer Olympic Games. There, he played alongside future Bayern coach Ottmar Hitzfeld as West Germany failed to qualify for the semifinals of the tournament, losing 3–2 to East Germany, a match in which Hoeneß scored his only goal of the tournament. This historic match was also the first between West Germany and East Germany.

Bayern Munich management

Immediately after retiring as a player in May 1979, Hoeneß was appointed commercial/general manager of Bayern Munich. On 27 November 2009, after 30 years as a general manager, Hoeneß was elected president of the club. Since Hoeneß joined, Bayern's management the club has had continued success on and off the field, winning 24 Bundesliga titles, 14 DFB-Pokal titles, two Champions League titles, one UEFA Cup, one UEFA Super Cup, one FIFA Club World Cup and the Intercontinental Cup.

During his reign, the club experienced strong growth in revenue and stature. Between 2002 and 2005, Bayern also built a state-of-the-art stadium, the Allianz Arena, at a cost of €340 million. Hoeneß was one of the catalyst for the building of the stadium.

Re-election as president of FC Bayern Munich, 2016–19 

In August 2016, Hoeneß announced that he would seek re-election to the post of president of Bayern Munich. He was re-elected in November 2016 with more than 97% of the votes, as there were no other candidates for this position.

On 1 May 2019, Hoeneß celebrated 40 years of working for Bayern's management. When he started on 1 May 1979, Bayern had twelve employees, 12 million Deutschmarks in revenue, and 8 million marks of debt. In November 2018, Bayern had over 1,000 employees and their revenue had risen to €657.4 million.

On 15 November 2019, Hoeneß retired as Bayern's president and was succeeded by Herbert Hainer. Hoeneß spent 49 years at Bayern, both as player and in management of the club.

Personal life
Hoeneß and his wife Susanne have two children, Sabine and Florian, and have been married for over 40 years. Hoeneß is a son of a master butcher, and now co-owns HoWe Wurstwaren KG, a Nuremberg-based bratwurst factory. Hoeneß's younger brother Dieter also had a very successful career as a player in the Bundesliga and for the West Germany national team.

On 17 February 1982, Hoeneß was the sole survivor of the crash of a light aircraft in which three others died. He was on his way to a West German national team friendly. Sleeping in the rear of the plane, he sustained only minor injuries.

Hoeneß has provided financial assistance, either personally or through organizing benefit games, to other German league teams like FC St. Pauli, Hertha BSC, Borussia Dortmund, 1860 München and Hansa Rostock.

Hoeneß has helped former Bayern players like Sebastian Deisler (depression), Breno (depression) and Gerd Müller (alcoholism) in times of need.

Tax evasion and imprisonment

In April 2013, it was reported that Hoeneß was being investigated for tax evasion. He was reported to have held a Swiss bank account for the purpose of evading taxes due on investment income, and to owe between €3.2 million and €7 million in taxes to the German state. The reports came after journalists "gained access to a document meant only for internal use by tax officials." Prosecutors from Munich carried out raids in offices of two Bavarian tax offices after Hoeneß filed a complaint. Despite increasing public criticism, Hoeneß has remained in his position as president and chairman of the supervisory board of Bayern Munich.

Hoeneß was accused of tax evasion and his trial began on 10 March 2014. The FC Bayern München AG supervisory board had a "unanimous opinion" that Hoeneß should continue in his role despite being sent to trial.

During the trial, he admitted evading 28.5 million euros in taxes. He was subsequently found guilty of seven serious counts of tax evasion and sentenced to three and a half years in prison on 13 March 2014. The following day he resigned from his roles as President of Bayern Munich e.V. and chairman of the board of Bayern Munich AG and announced that he would not be appealing against his sentence.

Hoeneß was to serve his sentence at Landsberg Prison. Hoeneß submitted a request to be confined to a different prison, however, he reported to Landsberg on 2 June 2014. During the first two weeks of his sentence, Hoeneß was housed in a larger cell with a cellmate "for medical reasons" and to help adjust to life behind bars. After the initial two weeks, he was moved into a single cell. On 2 January 2015, Hoeneß was granted day release. He had to return to prison at 6 p.m. every night.

There was an alleged attempt to extort €200,000 from Hoeneß whereby he and his family would be subjected to violence unless he paid up. A man was arrested in connection with the scheme. His imprisonment ended on 29 February 2016.

Career statistics

Honours
Bayern Munich
 Bundesliga: 1971–72, 1972–73, 1973–74
 DFB-Pokal: 1970–71
 European Cup: 1973–74, 1974–75, 1975–76
 Intercontinental Cup: 1976

West Germany
 FIFA World Cup: 1974
 UEFA European Championship: 1972; runner-up: 1976

Individual
 UEFA European Championship Team of the Tournament: 1972
 kicker Bundesliga Team of the Season: 1973–74

Literature
 Juan Moreno: Uli Hoeneß: Ein Mann sieht Rot. Piper Verlag, München 2014, .
 Patrick Strasser: Hier ist Hoeneß! Riva, München 2010, .
 Peter Bizer: Uli Hoeneß. Nachspiel. Mensch, Macher, Mythos. Ellert & Richter Verlag, Hamburg 2014, .
 Christoph Bausenwein: Das Prinzip Uli Hoeneß. Ein Leben in Widersprüchen. Verlag Die Werkstatt, Göttingen 2014, .
 Petja Posor: Der Fall Hoeneß als Skandal in den Medien. Anschlusskommunikation, Authentisierung und Systemstabilisierung. Universitätsverlag Konstanz, Konstanz 2015, .

References

External links

 
 
 
 
 
 1976 European Footballer of the Year ("Ballon d'Or") 1974 at RSSSF
 European Championships – UEFA Teams of Tournament at RSSSF

1952 births
Living people
Sportspeople from Ulm
German footballers
German people convicted of tax crimes
German prisoners and detainees
Prisoners and detainees of Germany
Association football forwards
Bundesliga players
FC Bayern Munich footballers
1. FC Nürnberg players
Germany international footballers
Germany under-21 international footballers
Germany youth international footballers
UEFA Euro 1972 players
1974 FIFA World Cup players
UEFA Euro 1976 players
UEFA European Championship-winning players
FIFA World Cup-winning players
Footballers at the 1972 Summer Olympics
Olympic footballers of West Germany
West German footballers
FC Bayern Munich non-playing staff
German football chairmen and investors
FC Bayern Munich board members
Sole survivors
Footballers from Baden-Württemberg
UEFA Champions League winning players